A Nymph of the Foothills is a 1918 American silent drama film directed by Frederick A. Thomson and starring Gladys Leslie, Alfred Kappeler and Walter Hiers.

Cast
 Gladys Leslie as Emmy Chaney
 Alfred Kappeler as Ben Kirkland
 Walter Hiers as Tubby
 Charles A. Stevenson as Henry Kirkland
 Arnold Lucy as Old Man

References

Bibliography
 Darby, William. Masters of Lens and Light: A Checklist of Major Cinematographers and Their Feature Films. Scarecrow Press, 1991.

External links
 

1918 films
1918 drama films
1910s English-language films
American silent feature films
Silent American drama films
American black-and-white films
Vitagraph Studios films
Films directed by Frederick A. Thomson
1910s American films